AACN may refer to:

Advanced Automatic Collision Notification
American Association of Colleges of Nursing
American Association of Critical-Care Nurses